Jason George Falinski (born 24 August 1970) is a former Australian Liberal Party politician. He was first elected as the Member for Mackellar in the Australian House of Representatives at the 2016 Australian election and was re-elected at the 2019 Australian election. He lost his re-election bid in the 2022 Australian federal election to independent candidate Sophie Scamps. During his time in office, Falinski served as Chair of the House of Representatives Standing Committee on Economics, and the Standing Committee on Tax and Revenue.

Early life and career
Falinski was born on 24 August 1970 in Manly, New South Wales. He is the oldest of four children born to Jill and Stanley Falinski. His father was born in Soviet Kyrgyzstan to Jewish parents originally from Poland and Russia, who had been subject to Soviet population transfers during World War II. His father's family immigrated to Australia from Poland in 1958 to escape post-war antisemitism. Falinski's father was a co-founder and managing director of computer retailer Osborne, until its collapse in 1995. On his mother's side, he has English and Irish heritage.

He attended Saint Ignatius' College, Riverview, then graduated from the University of Sydney with a Bachelor of Agricultural Economics. He later completed an MBA at the Australian Graduate School of Management at UNSW Sydney. 

Falinski was President of the New South Wales branch of the Young Liberals in 1994–1995,  and served as the Vice-President, in 1996–1996, and President, in 1997–1998, of the Australian Young Liberals.

Falinski worked as an adviser to former Liberal leaders John Hewson and Barry O'Farrell, and was a spokesperson for the Australian Republican Movement.

Falinski worked in corporate affairs for Credit Union Services Corporation Limited, and in Strategy and M&A for IAG before setting up his own company, CareWell Health, in 2005.

Local Government 
Falinski was elected to Warringah Council in September 2008 as a Councillor for A Ward.

Parliamentary Career
In April 2016, Falinski won an internal Liberal Party preselection in the seat of Mackellar defeating the then incumbent member, Bronwyn Bishop. This meant Falinski would go on to be the Liberal Party of Australia's candidate for the seat at the 2016 Australian election where he was subsequently elected. Falinski was re-elected for a second term at the 2019 Australian election, however he was unsuccessful in his re-election bid in the 2022 Australian election. 

Falinski is a member of the Moderate/Modern Liberal faction of the Liberal Party.

Economy 
Falinski has called for reform of the Australian Tax Office, stating that the onus of proof should lie with the ATO, not the taxpayer, in relation to allegations of fraud or evasion. He has also called for the introduction of a taxpayer bill of rights, and to empower the tax ombudsman with powers similar to the taxpayer advocate service in the US.

In his capacity as Chair of the Standing Committee on Economics, Falinski has called for the introduction of legislation which would require asset managers, including super funds and index funds, publish shareholder voting decisions to ensure they do not use proxy advisers to collude at shareholder meetings. The committee also recommended that mechanisms be put in place to ensure asset managers engage with their members when making voting decisions, and to require proxy advisers to hold a broader financial service licence than is currently the case.

Falinski supports the development of Australia's retail corporate bond market, noting that Australia's market had been held back by regulatory failure and institutional obstructionism. The Standing Committee on Tax and Revenue noted that the Australian market had less depth, breadth and liquidity than the same market in New Zealand, even though the latter’s capital markets and savings pool are much smaller.

Falinski supports innovation-focussed reform, having chaired an Inquiry into the tax treatment of employee share schemes. In 2021, the Inquiry recommended reforms which were accepted by then Treasurer, Josh Frydenberg, including legislative changes which would allow an employee to leave their job without facing a large tax bill on shares they had been issued. These reforms were welcomed and warmly received by industry groups.

Transport 
Falinski has indicated his support for proposals to extend a metro line from Chatswood to Frenchs Forest to combat congestion on the Northern Beaches.

Falinski is an enthusiastic supporter of the Beaches Link Tunnel, and has expressed his disappointment at delays to the project due to lacklustre funding commitments from the NSW State Government following the resignation of Gladys Berejiklian.

During his time as the member for Mackellar, Falinski consistently campaigned for funding to upgrade Wakehurst Parkway by widening and flood-proofing this critical arterial road. In March 2022, Falinski was successful in securing a $75 million budget commitment from the Commonwealth Government to carry out these upgrades, and this commitment which was matched by the NSW State Government bringing the total investment to $150 million. Following the election of the Albanese Government, the Commonwealth Government withdrew it's funding commitments in their October budget update.

Environment 
In October 2021, Falinski was named as one of several moderate Liberal MPs pressuring the Morrison Government to commit to a net-zero by 2050 target in the lead up to COP26, which they ultimately succeeded in doing. Falinski was credited with hosting and convening regular zoom meetings with like-minded colleagues to discuss how they could get the Prime Minister Scott Morrison to commit to their position.

Falinski is staunchly opposed to renewal of Petroleum Exploration Permit - 11 (PEP-11) licence and introduced a notice of motion in the House of Representatives against it's renewal. Renewal of the licence, which allows for offshore drilling for gas exploration between Sydney and Newcastle, was opposed by many community groups and MPs however the decision to reject renewal required approval from the Federal and relevant State resources minister. In December 2021 the then Prime Minister Scott Morrison held a press conference indicating that the licence had been cancelled crediting Falinski's advocacy amongst others for his decision. 

Morrison's announcement regarding the cancellation of PEP-11 was scrutinised following the defeat of the Morrison Government at the 2022 Australian election, when it emerged the then Prime Minister had secretly had himself sworn in to multiple ministerial portfolios during the Covid-19 pandemic and used this authority to cancel the permit.

Integrity 
Falinski has called for reform to political advertising laws to ensure truth in advertising laws apply to political parties and candidates. In 2019 Falinski and the Independent member for Warringah, Zali Steggall, made a joint submission to the Joint Standing Committee on Electoral Matters to push for truth in political advertising laws.

Falinski was one of several politicians featured in Craig Reucassel's documentary on political donations and lobbying, Big Deal.

Parliamentary Diversity 
In March 2021, Falinski co-authored an opinion piece with the outgoing member for Boothby, Nicolle Flint MP, calling for the Liberal Party of Australia to consider adopting a candidates list, in a similar vein to the model introduced by David Cameron to the UK Conservatives. This proposal advocates for the administrative wing of the Liberal Party to identify and train potential candidates from a diverse range of backgrounds to improve the calibre and diversity of candidates at elections.

Controversies
In late 2017, Falinski was one of several MPs and Senators who was identified as being potentially ineligible to serve in Parliament due to being in breach of Section 44(i) of the Australian Constitution, in Falinski's case because of his Polish heritage through his father. Falinski provided legal advice indicating he did not hold Polish citizenship and was ultimately not one of the MPs or Senators who was required to resign. 

In 2019 Australian media reported that Falinski and other members of a taxpayer-funded government inquiry into franking credits policy may have acted inappropriately by allegedly using the inquiry as a means of soliciting donations. The incident involving Falinski centred around communications sent to super fund trustees in his electorate inviting them to attend a $25 a head function where the Liberal committee chair, Tim Wilson, was billed as the guest speaker.

Also in 2019, Falinski was accused of misusing research by cherry picking statistics to justify the government imposing a drug testing policy on welfare recipients.

At the 2022 election Falinski attended a joint event with the Liberal candidate for Warringah, Katherine Deves, who had attracted controversy for comments describing transgender children as 'surgically mutilated and sterilised'. Police were called to the event after a man identifying himself as a volunteer for Sophie Scamps was charged with common assault after behaving aggressively towards Liberal volunteers.

References

Jewish Australian politicians
Australian people of Polish-Jewish descent
Australian people of Russian-Jewish descent
Australian republicans
Liberal Party of Australia members of the Parliament of Australia
Living people
Members of the Australian House of Representatives for Mackellar
New South Wales local councillors
People educated at Saint Ignatius' College, Riverview
Politicians from Sydney
University of New South Wales alumni
University of Sydney alumni
1970 births
21st-century Australian politicians